The Château de Saint-Geniès is a château in Saint-Geniès, Dordogne, Nouvelle-Aquitaine, France.

Principally constructed in the 13th and 16th centuries, parts of it have been classified as a monument historique since 1976.

References

Châteaux in Dordogne
Monuments historiques of Dordogne